Emma Jillian Kete (born 1 September 1987) is a New Zealand footballer who most recently played as a centre forward for Canberra United and the New Zealand national team.

Club career
Kete joined Ottawa Fury Women in July 2009, playing alongside fellow Kiwis Amber Hearn, Hayley Moorwood and Ria Percival at the Canadian W-League club.

She signed for Naisten liiga club PK-35 Vantaa in September 2011. With PK-35 she won her first trophy by winning the Finnish Women's Cup.

She then played at Canberra United, and won the W-League with them. After the season she transferred to Sydney FC,  who then won the W-League as well.

In 2013, she transferred to German side SC 07 Bad Neuenahr.

In early 2014 she then moved on to her first American team, signing with Western New York Flash. She appeared only in three games. She then moved in July 2014 to join newcomers to the FA Women's Super League in England, Manchester City. She re-joined Canberra United in September 2015.

International career
Kete travelled with the New Zealand U20 national team side to the 2006 Women's U-20 World Cup in Russia, making a late substitute appearance in their opening game against Australia.

Kete made her debut with the senior national team against Australia on 4 February 2007.

She was included in the New Zealand squad for the 2008 Summer Olympics, starting in each of New Zealand's group games against Japan (2–2), Norway (1–0 loss) and USA (4–0 loss).

She was part of New Zealand's squad at the 2015 FIFA Women's World Cup in Canada.

Personal life
Emma was married to England footballer Jodie Taylor.

Honors
PK-35 Vantaa
 Naisten Liiga: 2011
 Naisten Cup: 2011

Canberra United FC
 W-League: 2011–12

Sydney FC
 W-League: 2012–13

Manchester City
 Women's Super League Cup: 2014

References

External links

1987 births
Living people
Association footballers from Auckland
Canberra United FC players
Expatriate women's footballers in Germany
Expatriate women's footballers in England
Expatriate women's soccer players in the United States
Women's Super League players
Footballers at the 2008 Summer Olympics
Manchester City W.F.C. players
National Women's Soccer League players
New Zealand expatriate women's association footballers
New Zealand expatriate sportspeople in Australia
New Zealand expatriate sportspeople in the United States
New Zealand expatriate sportspeople in Germany
New Zealand expatriate sportspeople in England
New Zealand women's association footballers
New Zealand women's international footballers
Olympic association footballers of New Zealand
Sydney FC (A-League Women) players
Western New York Flash players
Women's association football forwards
2011 FIFA Women's World Cup players
2015 FIFA Women's World Cup players
2019 FIFA Women's World Cup players
LGBT association football players
New Zealand LGBT sportspeople
Lesbian sportswomen
SC 07 Bad Neuenahr players
Association footballers' wives and girlfriends
Ottawa Fury (women) players
USL W-League (1995–2015) players
New Zealand expatriate sportspeople in Canada
Expatriate women's soccer players in Canada
Expatriate women's soccer players in Australia